Kurt Schulz (1913–1957) was a German cinematographer.

Selected filmography

Cinematographer
 Hotel Sacher (1939)
 A Salzburg Comedy (1943)
 The Black Robe (1944)
 Young Hearts (1944)
 No Place for Love (1947)
 Thank You, I'm Fine (1948)
 Everything Will Be Better in the Morning (1948)
 Nothing But Coincidence (1949)
 One Night Apart (1950)
 The Black Forest Girl (1950)
 The Heath Is Green (1951)
 The Land of Smiles (1952)
 Mikosch Comes In (1952)
 At the Well in Front of the Gate (1952)
 Mailman Mueller (1953)
 When The Village Music Plays on Sunday Nights (1953)
 When the White Lilacs Bloom Again (1953)
 Hooray, It's a Boy! (1953)
 On the Reeperbahn at Half Past Midnight (1954)
 The Gypsy Baron (1954)
 Emil and the Detectives (1954)
 Yes, Yes, Love in Tyrol (1955)
 Charley's Aunt (1956)
 Black Forest Melody (1956)
 Das Sonntagskind (1956)

Assistant Camera Operator
 The Merry Heirs (1933)
 Triumph of the Will (1935)
 Hokum (1936)
 Heimweh (1937)
 Anna Favetti (1938)
 Three Fathers for Anna (1939)
 Sensationsprozess Casilla (1939)
 A Foreign Affair (1948)

External links

1910s births
1957 deaths
German cinematographers
Film people from Berlin